Steven Plucnar Jacobsen (born 22 October 2000) is a Danish handball player for KIF Kolding.

Achievements 
 Danish Handball Cup
Winner: 2019
 Swedish Handball Cup
Runner-up: 2022

References 

2000 births
Living people
Danish male handball players
Lugi HF players
Expatriate handball players
Danish expatriate sportspeople in Sweden